Constantin Gane (March 27, 1885 – April or May 1962) was a Romanian novelist, amateur historian, biographer and memoirist. Born into the boyar aristocracy of Western Moldavia, he worked as a lawyer in Bucharest, achieving literary notoriety with his recollections from the Second Balkan War and the Romanian front of World War I. By the 1930s, he was primarily a writer on historical and genealogical topics, famous for his contribution to women's history. An apologist for Romanian conservatism and Junimism, Gane also completed in 1936 a biography of Petre P. Carp. He was editor at Convorbiri Literare and a columnist for Cuvântul, also putting out his own magazine, Sânziana.

The late 1930s attracted Gane into fascist politics, leading him to join the Iron Guard. This in turn led to his marginalization and internment by the National Renaissance Front government. Returning to prominence during World War II, when the Guard produced its National Legionary State, Gane served as Romanian ambassador to the Kingdom of Greece, then retired from politics and resumed his work in literature. Again repressed following the establishment of a Romanian communist regime, he spent 13 years in confinement, ultimately dying at Aiud prison in 1962. His work was banned by communist censors, then selectively recovered from 1969. It was revisited and republished in the post-communist decades, although interest in it remained marginal.

Biography

Youth and writing career
Born in Botoșani, Constantin was the son of Ștefan Gane. The writer repeatedly claimed multiple descent from an old boyar family of Moldavia, the Gănești. According to genealogist Mihai Sorin Rădulescu, his only proven link to this clan was through his paternal grandmother. Through this connection, the family were related to Postelnic Matei Gane and writer-politician Nicolae Gane, and also, more distantly, to ethnographer Arthur Gorovei. The latter lived in Nicolae Gane's house at Fălticeni and assisted Constantin with genealogical research. Ștefan Gane was originally named "Gani". He also descended from boyardom, but had more recent Greek Romanian ancestry, traceable to the Phanariote period.

The writer's mother was Constanța née Canano, one of the last surviving members from a Moldavian family of notables. Gane later claimed that she was a descendant of Byzantine aristocracy, a theory dismissed as self-aggrandizing by Rădulescu. Ștefan and Constanța had another son, Gheorghe, who trained as an engineer and married the Bessarabian belle Elena Morariu-Andreevici. She was the niece of Silvestru Morariu Andrievici, Bishop of Bukovina, and the great-granddaughter of poet Constantin Stamati.

According to his own recollections, Constantin grew up passionate about storytelling, picking up accounts from the family cook, a senior Romani man (and former slave), and from his maternal grandmother, who was passionate about Napoleon. After mediocre and unruly beginnings in school, he improved himself to take first prizes, being largely motivated by books which were offered to the highest ranking graduate. He completed A. T. Laurian High School in 1903 and went on to study law in Germany, obtaining a doctorate from the University of Rostock in 1910. After returning home, he worked as a lawyer for some fifteen years, both in his native town and in the national capital Bucharest. In the early 1910s, his prose was hosted in Viața Romînească magazine. In 1913, Gane took part as a volunteer in the Second Balkan War, destroying his literary notebooks before his departure for the front. From 1916, he also fought in the campaigns of World War I, part of the 8th Chasseurs Regiment stationed at Mănăstirea Cașin. His combat experience was recorded in Amintirile unui fost holeric ("The Recollection of a Former Cholera Patient", 1914; Romanian Academy prize) and Prin viroage și coclauri ("Through Ravines and Boondocks", 1922). This was followed in 1923 by a family history, Pe aripa vremei ("On the Wing of Time").

In adulthood, Gane remained passionate about history, traveling domestically and abroad, rifling through archives and libraries, visiting museums and artistic monuments and researching oral tradition. He published prose (especially of a historical character), articles, notes and reviews, correspondence, travel accounts, plays and novel fragments in Epoca, Universul Literar, Curentul, Cele Trei Crișuri, Politica, Revista Fundațiilor Regale, Luceafărul and Flacăra, and Convorbiri Literare, serving for a while in 1926 as the latter's editor. He returned in 1927 with the notes of Întâmplarea cea mare ("Major Occurrence"), followed by a series of historical novels and tracts: Trecute vieți de doamne și domnițe ("Bygone Lives of Queens and Princesses", 3 volumes, 1932–1939); Farmece ("Charms", 1933); Acum o sută de ani ("One Hundred Years Ago", 2 volumes, 1935); P. P. Carp și locul său în istoria politică a țării ("P. P. Carp and His Place in the Country's Political History", 2 volumes, 1936); Domnița Alexandrina Ghica și contele D'Antraigues ("Princess Alexandrina Ghica and the Count D'Antraigues", 1937); Dincolo de zbuciumul veacului ("Beyond the Fretting of an Era", 1939).

He also held conferences and, between 1929 and 1937, a series of Radio Bucharest lectures on historical, cultural and literary themes, including the first trial of Mihail Kogălniceanu, Dimitrie Cantemir, and the novels of Stefan Zweig. Other such lectures focused on details from the family life of Mihnea Turcitul, or detailed theories about the meaning of the ancestral ballad Miorița. In the latter case, Gane argued that folk poetry had recorded the mutual enmity between Moldavia and Wallachia, including their territorial conflicts over Putna County. This allowed him to date Miorița back to the 1400s or earlier. He also contributed to Ion Gigurtu's Libertatea, where he published a study on the formation of Romania's political parties (January 1934) and a genealogical essay on Maurice Paléologue (February 1935).

Far-right engagement, repression, and death
Before 1934, Gane lived on Enei Street, after which he moved to a home on Calea Griviţei, near Gara de Nord. He joined the Romanian Writers' Society that year, and, from June, began issuing his research on the female branches of the Callimachi family as a serial for Realitatea Ilustrată. In 1937, Gane founded and led the Bucharest-based Sânziana magazine. During this time, he also published a historical column in the newspaper Cuvântul. Politically, Gane gravitated toward the far-right, and joined the Iron Guard before 1938, allegedly serving on its supervisory council, or "Senate". This made him a target for repression by the rival National Renaissance Front: its regime prevented political suspects from working and, according to the diaries of Victor Slăvescu, Gane "had no means to support himself"; Sânziana was banned in early 1938. When banks refused to loan Gane any money, Slăvescu offered him gifts, which Gane promised to repay with books from his own collection. By September 1939, civil war had erupted between the Front and the Guard. Gane was arrested alongside many other Guardists, and held in confinement at Miercurea Ciuc, but was soon released following pleas from Petre P. Panaitescu and Radu R. Rosetti.

In 1940–1941, the Iron Guard took over government and established the "National Legionary State". Promoted in that interval, Gane returned to radio journalism, producing propaganda for the Guard's social service, Ajutorul Legionar. He served as ambassador to the Kingdom of Greece; according to Rădulescu, he might have been chosen for that office due to his Greek lineage. Nonetheless, while in Athens, Gane advocated on behalf of the minority Aromanians. Returning to Romania, he was briefly involved in the cultural life of Transnistria Governorate—carved out Soviet Ukraine by Romania in the wake of Operation Barbarossa. In February 1942, as a speaker of Russian, he was ordered to assist Ion Radu Mircea with collecting and translating historical documents stored in Odessa, but failed to show up for this assignment. Staying in Romania for the rest of World War II, Gane focused his biographical research on the Mavrodin boyars of Teleorman County, with a topical volume published in 1942. He also put out a 1943 sequel to Trecute vieți, titled Amărâte și vesele vieți de jupânese și cucoane ("Bittersweet Lives of Dames and Boyaresses"). A historical novel, Rădăcini ("Roots"), was published in 1947, and remains his final work.

In early 1944, Gane was putting out the specialized magazine Arhiva Genealogică Română, which he described as the continuation of works undertaken by Sever Zotta. Shortly after Romania proclaimed an armistice with Soviet Russia, he was again arrested, then sent to a concentration camp in Caracal, sharing his cell with Panaitescu and the missionary priest Ilarion Felea. According to Felea, the conditions were generally harsh, and food was scarce. In 1946, a number of his books were formally banned through an order issued by Propaganda Minister Petre Constantinescu-Iași. Gane was released from camp by 1948, but singled out for repression by the communist regime. Agents of the Securitate identified him as a figure on the far-right of anti-communist resistance, reporting that Gane was acting as an adviser to Nicolae Petrașcu. 

Gane was re-arrested in December 1948, as part of a clampdown, and sentenced in 1949. He was dispatched to Aiud prison in Cluj Region, where he was subjected to mistreatment and pushed to exhaustion. Though he reportedly maintained his humor and was physically strong, his refusal to undergo re-education made him a target for special abuse: he was sent into solitary confinement in an unheated cell, and made to stand on his feet throughout the working day. He complained of exhaustion and told his jailer that he was on the brink of dying; they ultimately released him after other prisoners proceeded to bang on their cell doors and demand that Gane be released. The Securitate promised him treatment for his medical conditions, if he agreed to write articles praising the regime—something which Gane refused to do. While he was still recovering in 1962, the authorities reportedly issued papers allowing his release from prison. Gane died in that facility before this could happen, and was buried in an unmarked grave. His death is commonly believed to have occurred in April 1962, but the Gane family records the date as May 13.

In 1969, a relative liberalization allowed mentions of the deceased writer, and his nephew, Gheorghe Gane, Jr (1925–2008), published a brief bio in Clopotul of Botoșani. He also kept his uncle's genealogical archive in a Bucharest garage, before emigrating to West Germany; some of these papers were then preserved by genealogist and family friend Ștefan C. Gorovei. Trecute vieți de doamne și domnițe was reissued by Editura Junimea in 1971–1973, albeit touched by communist censorship. Such treatment was ended by the Romanian Revolution of 1989, which allowed Gane's work to be revisited. A Constantin Gane Street was consecrated in Botoșani, while, in 2006, Amărâte și vesele vieți went through a reprint at Gheorghe Marin Speteanu publishers of Bucharest. Although this was largely a Speteanu family project, and therefore "not first-rate", Rădulescu expressed hopes that it would resurrect interest in Gane's work. Nevertheless, as Gorovei argues, by 2011 Gane was still "entirely outside the scope of public attention." Humanitas published an unabridged edition of Trecute vieți in 2014. This was followed in 2016 by a reprint of Amărâte și vesele vieți, at Editura Corint.

Work

Novelist and biographer
Gane's debut was as a humorist—a talented one, according to fellow writer-historian Nicolae Iorga. The war memoirs were noted for their sincerity and patriotic emphasis. His first book featured a detailed description of his bout with cholera, which he contracted while fighting in Bulgaria. It was among the first literary records of the Second Balkan War in Romania—alongside works by Iorga, Al. Lascarov-Moldovanu, and Haralamb Lecca; as well as one of the period books giving Romanian impressions of Bulgaria. As such, Gane is highly critical of Bulgarian society, describing the barren landscape as fundamentally inferior to the corresponding Romanian bank of the Danube. Amintirile unui fost holeric stands out for its defense of the 1913 expedition, describing the masses of soldiers as overall enthusiastic about going to war. As Gane argues, Romania "restored peace" and earned Europe's respect; this contrasts pronouncements by other veterans, including V. Dragoșescu—who claimed that the campaign could only hurt Romania in the long run. Prin viroage și coclauri is a first-hand source on life during trench warfare, detailing the parties and superstitions of soldiers reduced to that lifestyle. Întâmplarea cea mare is a more subdued travel account where the author digresses into meditations on Romanian and foreign history. The artifacts of ancient Egypt and especially Greece lead him to literary and mythological reflections. He also describes these countries' present-day realities, sometimes in a humorous tone.

When writing about Romanian history, Gane's historic and literary focuses combined to produce evocative social and political portraits. In 1947, literary critic Perpessicius noted that Gane struck a "singular note in our historical literature", moving between the "romanticized document" and the novel itself—in both sets of works, the narrator shows up as a "discreet" participant, with clues and musings. Pe aripa vremei traces his own family's genealogical tree up to the foundation of Moldavia, while Acum o sută de ani recounts the main events that occurred in the Danubian Principalities a century earlier (1834–1835). His interest in the human character was explored in Farmece, an account of Despot Vodă; and in Dincolo de zbuciumul veacului, which selects grandiose and tragic figures from the turbulent Middle Ages. A family saga centered on the estate of Măcișeni, Rădăcini did not have much impact, although it was favorably reviewed by Perpessicius. The latter praised Gane's talent for inventing emblematic characters to condense and highlight social history, though he suggested that some notes "sounded off-key". Gane's one play, Phrynea, remains in manuscript form.
 
Gane's historical accounts suffer from minute genealogies, an excess of documentary detail, polemical interventions and confusing or incoherent passages. One enduring and poorly reviewed trait was Gane's willingness to connect his family with the crucial events of Moldavia's past. In 1939, the literary scholar George Călinescu described Gane as the author of "corporate literature", who outlined a defense of the aristocracy and included himself in it, "seeking to prove his belonging to that caste". Călinescu openly ridiculed Gane for passing trivia about his own family into his works. Gane responded that there was nothing commonplace about his family. The writings did earn praise from various professional historians, including Iorga and, later, Lucian Boia; the latter sees Gane as "an 'amateur' historian, but quite professional with the amplitude of his documentation and his unfaltering narration". Likewise, academic Paul Cernovodeanu describes Gane as a "publicist with a passion for history and genealogy", but also as an "expert" and "researcher".

Gane's 1936 homage to Petre P. Carp is noted for its "hagiographic" defense of the statesman, including against assessments that Carp was wrong not to nationalize the oil industry; some of the chapters, such as the one devoted to Junimea society, are of documentary interest. The book, and especially its opening chapter, highlighted a clash of conservative visions between Iorga and Gane. In his response, Iorga advised Gane to refrain from writing political history, for which he was unqualified. Iorga substantiated this allegation by listing errors supposedly found in Gane's chapter, including the "calumny" regarding Alexandru Ioan Cuza's involvement in a conspiracy against Barbu Catargiu. Iorga also notes Gane's obstinacy in denying evidence about Carp's lowly origin and for "exaggerating" his political role, but also praises him for rediscovering Carp's first published essays. Controversy surrounds other such contributions to the biographical genre. Perpessicius views Gane's work on the Count d'Antraigues as a "most important" contribution, commending Gane for his research into the Dijon city archives. However, later reviewers have argued that the book is in large part an unwitting hoax. Cernovodeanu criticizes Gane for basing his entire book on a "romantic" theory, which identified "Princess Alexandrina Ghica" with a daughter of Grigore III; according to Cernovodeanu, the "Princess" was actually an impostor, and d'Antraigues her enabler.

Women's historian
Gane's enduring masterpiece is Trecute vieți de doamne și domnițe, volume I of which was granted a prize by the Romanian Academy. The book features a vast array of noble ladies from the time of the first voievodes until the union of the Principalities, against the backdrop of chaotic historical events. Among the more memorable figures are Doamna Chiajna and Elisabeta Movilă, and the tragic end of Domnița Ruxandra has drawn praise. As noted by critics, the subjects are unusual and captivating, revealed in stories full of color, recounted in a language of archaic vigor. In 1933, theologian and journalist Grigore T. Marcu saluted Gane's "exceptional talent for storytelling, his voice seeped into the dusty chronicles of our nation", producing "a lively fresco from the lives of princely ladies and children". Some 70 years later, writer Gheorghe Grigurcu revisited Trecute vieți as "one of the essential books of my childhood [...], with its rich literary savor pulsating within the arteries of complicated historical reconstructions". According to literary critic Ioan Milică, Gane reused classical storytelling formulas recalling Ion Budai-Deleanu and Ion Creangă in creating portrait-caricatures—for instance, that of the sailor-prince Nicholas Mavrogenes. Love stories, abductions and releases, spectacular executions (such as those of Constantin Brâncoveanu and his sons), rises and falls succeed one another in a steady rhythm that recreates the atmosphere of the periods it depicts.

Scholar Constanța Vintilă-Ghițulescu views Gane's study as a "landmark" in Romanian women's history, but also cautions that it belongs to the "tiny biographical" genre and often switches focus to the male protagonists. In 2009, medievalist Ioan Marian Țiplic noted that Trecute vieți remained "the sole work of synthesis focusing on medieval women in all Romanian-language historiography, and even this one folds on analyzing matrimonial links and the role of women [in establishing] such links." As noted by historian Radu Mârza, "many of [Gane's] assessments", including some of his claims about Michael the Brave, Doamna Stanca, and Nicolae Pătrașcu, are flawed, "bookish rather than scholarly." Similarly, Slavist Emil Turdeanu writes that Gane's depiction of Ruxandra's marriage to Tymofiy Khmelnytsky is "not only shaky, but also counterfactual." Among Gane's contemporaries, genealogists Gheorghe G. Bezviconi and George D. Florescu both criticized the writer for his over-enthusiasm and carelessness; Bezviconi dismissed Trecute vieți as a "romanticized biography". Some passages of Trecute vieți also reflect Gane's polemics against Romanian Catholicism, from an Orthodox position. This prompted Catholic writer Mariu Theodorian-Carada to publish "corrigenda" claiming to expose Gane's "mistaken, sometimes unfair" views on the subject. According to Mârza, Gane's book is overall "seriously researched", but "is not scientific in nature, being rather a popularizing work".

The final installments of Trecute vieți were panned by Iorga, who noted that their "pioneering notices" were unveiled in the form of "light anecdote about serious people". Sections of these books drew heavily on new archival material, including the letters of Maria Moruzi Comnen. The author also had interviews with Marthe Bibesco, who provided details about the mental illness plaguing Zoe Brâncoveanu, and leading to her divorce from Prince Gheorghe Bibescu. As part of his research, Gane found and published portraits of Smaranda Vogoride, Princess-consort to Mihail Sturdza, and of Lady Marițica Văcărescu-Bibescu.

Nevertheless, Gane's research of the 19th century continued to feature questionable material. As noted by historian Pavel Strihan, Gane credited urban legends about Prince Bibescu and Marițica, and gave a-historical explanations for their legal conflict with the Wallachian Ordinary Assembly. As literary accomplishments, these final works were criticized by Iorga. He was puzzled by Gane's decision to include a rhyming preface ("curious verse, which we can do without"), as well as for including "quite doubtful" explanations for the reader, having omitted a number of bibliographic sources. As argued by reviewer Sorin Lavric, Amărâte și vesele vieți is a counterweight to the main volumes, indirectly showing the relative emancipation of women under the Regulamentul Organic regime, but also the "baseness" of life in the post-aristocratic age. It also has a noted regionalist bias: there are 11 entries from Moldavia, 4 from Wallachia and one Englishwoman (Maria Rosetti).

Notes

References
Lucian Boia, Capcanele istoriei. Elita intelectuală românească între 1930 și 1950. Bucharest: Humanitas, 2012.  
Paul Cernovodeanu, "Un conte aventurier și o falsă prințesă", in Magazin Istoric, July 2002, pp. 83–86.
Raluca-Simona Deac, "Representations of Identity, Self, and Otherness in the Romanian Memoirs of the Balkan Wars (1912–1913)", in Philobiblion. Transylvanian Journal of Multidisciplinary Research in Humanities, Vol. XVIII, Issue 2, July–December 2013, pp. 297–314.
C. Gane, "Vorbe în vânt", in Universul Literar, Issue 6/1940, pp. 4, 8.
Ștefan C. Gorovei, "Dialog epistolar Artur Gorovei–Constantin Gane", in Acta Moldaviae Septentrionalis, Vol. X, 2011, pp. 225–236.
Nicolae Iorga, 
Istoria literaturii românești contemporane. II: În căutarea fondului (1890–1934). Bucharest: Editura Adevĕrul, 1934.
"Dări de seamă. C. Gane, P. P. Carp și locul său în istoria politică a țerii, I", in Revista Istorică, Vol. XXII, Issues 10–12, October–December 1936, pp. 352–355.
Radu Mârza, "Implicarea familiei în diplomație la Mihai Viteazul: practica trimiterii familiei proprii ca ostatică la partenerii politici", in Revista Bistriței, Vol. XII–XIII, 1999, pp. 73–83.
Perpessicius, "Comentarii critice. Mențiuni critice. Cronica romanelor. Cezar Petrescu: Tapirul—Dan Petrașincu: Timpuri împlinite—C. Gane: Rădăcini. Romanul Măcișenilor", in Revista Fundațiilor Regale, Vol. XIV, Issues 10–11, October–November 1947, pp. 82–96.
Mihai Sorin Rădulescu, "Cartea de istorie. L'Histoire des femmes, o reeditare binevenită", in Viața Românească, Issues 8–9/2008, pp. 211–213.
Pavel Strihan, "Un divorț domnesc", in Magazin Istoric, June 1969, pp. 68–71.

1885 births
1962 deaths
Romanian biographers
Romanian genealogists
20th-century Romanian historians
Romanian medievalists
Romanian literary historians
Oral historians
20th-century memoirists
Romanian memoirists
Romanian travel writers
Romanian historical novelists
Women's historians
Romanian humorists
Romanian columnists
Romanian magazine founders
Romanian magazine editors
Romanian propagandists
Romanian radio presenters
20th-century Romanian lawyers
Members of the Iron Guard
20th-century Romanian politicians
Ambassadors of Romania to Greece
People from Botoșani
Romanian people of Greek descent
Members of the Romanian Orthodox Church
Critics of the Catholic Church
Romanian nobility
University of Rostock alumni
Romanian military personnel of the Second Balkan War
Romanian military personnel of World War I
Romanian people of World War II
Inmates of Aiud prison
Romanian people who died in prison custody
Censorship in Romania
Prisoners who died in Securitate custody